Concord is the name of several communities in the U.S. state of West Virginia.

Concord, Hampshire County, West Virginia

Athens, West Virginia, formerly known as Concord, and location of Concord University